Jannatabad (also Romanized as Jannatābād) is a village in Mahvelat-e Jonubi Rural District, in the Central District of Mahvelat County, Razavi Khorasan Province, Iran. At the 2006 census, its population was 1,210, in 289 families.

References 

Populated places in Mahvelat County